Juno Temple (born 21 July 1989) is an English actress. She has appeared in the films Notes on a Scandal (2006), Atonement (2007), The Other Boleyn Girl (2008), The Three Musketeers (2011), The Dark Knight Rises (2012), Magic Magic (2013), Afternoon Delight (2013), Maleficent (2014), Black Mass (2015), Unsane (2018), and Maleficent: Mistress of Evil (2019). Temple also has starred in the television series Vinyl (2016), Dirty John (2018–2019), Ted Lasso (2020–present), Little Birds (2020), and The Offer (2022).

Temple received the BAFTA Rising Star Award in 2013. She was nominated for two Primetime Emmy Awards and three Screen Actors Guild Awards for her role as Keeley Jones in Ted Lasso, in addition to being nominated for a Critics' Choice Television Award and winning a Satellite Award for her role as Bettye McCartt in The Offer.

Early life
Juno Temple was born in the Hammersmith area of London on 21 July 1989, the daughter of film producer Amanda Pirie and film director Julien Temple. She has two younger brothers, Leo and Felix. Her aunt Nina Temple was the last General Secretary of the Communist Party of Great Britain. She grew up in Taunton, Somerset, where she attended Enmore Primary School, Bedales School, and King's College.

Film career
Temple began her career as a child actress in the 1997 film Vigo: Passion for Life, a film about Jean Vigo. Her father directed her in the role of Emma Southey in the 2000 film, Pandaemonium.

Early in her career, she won critical praise for several supporting roles. One reviewer said that she played her part in Notes on a Scandal (2006) with "petulance and angst", while her performance as Lola Quincey in Atonement (2007) was called "impressive". She auditioned to play Luna Lovegood in Harry Potter and the Order of the Phoenix (2007), though the role ultimately went to Evanna Lynch. In 2009, Temple played Eema in the comedy Year One alongside Jack Black and Michael Cera, Anna in Jaco Van Dormael's Mr. Nobody, and Di Radfield in the film adaptation of Sheila Kohler's novel, Cracks. Some of her other film credits at the time include Celia in St Trinian's (2007) and St Trinian's 2: The Legend of Fritton's Gold (2009), Jennifer "Drippy" Logan in Wild Child (2008), and Jane Parker in The Other Boleyn Girl (2008).

In 2010, she starred in Abe Sylvia's Dirty Girl, which premiered at the Toronto International Film Festival; and appeared in a sketch for FunnyOrDie called "Cycop", which featured the protagonist from the indie film The Mother of Invention (2009) in a poorly made film of his creation. She also had a major role in the film Kaboom (2010), which won the first Queer Palm award. In 2011, Temple appeared in Paul W. S. Anderson's 3D film adaptation of The Three Musketeers, as Anne of Austria, the Queen Consort of France. That same year she played Dottie in Killer Joe, a role Temple received after sending an unsolicited audition tape to the movie's casting director. She also starred in Elgin Jamess 2011 film Little Birds. James offered her the choice of playing either of the two female leads and she chose to portray Lily, citing that she connected with the character more and "wanted to set her free". Temple and James worked on Little Birds together for two years, and continued to collaborate afterwards, referring to each other as "best friends" and "family" in interviews. James has said he made Little Birds to honor the strong women in his life, including Temple. That same year, she was named a Brit to Watch by the British Academy of Film and Television Arts. 

In 2012, she appeared in The Dark Knight Rises, as a "street-smart Gotham girl", and portrayed Diane in the lesbian werewolf tale Jack & Diane. In February 2013, Temple won the EE Rising Star BAFTA Award, voted for by the public.

Temple had a supporting role as Deborah Hussey in the true-crime film Black Mass (2015), which starred Johnny Depp; and played Jamie Vine, an A&R assistant for the fictional American Century record company, in the 2016 HBO series Vinyl. In August 2020, Temple began a recurring role as Keeley, a former girlfriend of one of the team players and the unofficial team publicist, on the Apple TV+ series Ted Lasso.

Temple has also appeared in the music videos for Kid Harpoon's "Milkmaid" and Plushgun's "Just Impolite".

In 2018-2019, Temple played a focal role as the protagonist's daughter in the Bravo series "Dirty John", which was later acquired by Netflix. In 2020, she won the Best Actress award at the Prague Independent Film Festival for her role in the film Lost Transmissions.

In 2022, Temple appeared in the Paramount+ miniseries The Offer, depicting the production of The Godfather.

Personal life
From 2013 to 2016, Temple was in a relationship with American actor Michael Angarano, with whom she lived in the Los Feliz neighborhood of Los Angeles. She previously lived in Soho, London.

Filmography

Film

Television

Awards and nominations

References

Further reading

External links

1989 births
Living people
Actresses from London
BAFTA Rising Star Award winners
English expatriates in the United States
English child actresses
English film actresses
English television actresses
English voice actresses
People educated at Bedales School
People educated at King's College, Taunton
People from Hammersmith
People from Los Feliz, Los Angeles
People from Soho
People from Taunton
20th-century English actresses
21st-century English actresses